Philicity Asuako (born 25 December 1999) is a Ghanaian international footballer who plays as a defender. She has appeared in one match for the Ghana women's national football team. She was on the Ghana squad at the 2018 Africa Women Cup of Nations but did not appear in any matches.

References

1999 births
Living people
Ghanaian women's footballers
Ghana women's international footballers
Women's association football defenders
Police Ladies F.C. (Ghana) players
Thunder Queens F.C. players